The year 1797 in architecture involved some significant events.

Buildings and structures

Buildings

 Ditherington Flax Mill, in Shrewsbury, England, is completed; by the end of the 20th century it will be the oldest iron-framed building in the world and is seen as the world's first skyscraper.
 First Bank of the United States in Philadelphia, Pennsylvania, designed by Samuel Blodgett, is completed (begun in 1795).
 Old City Hall (Lancaster, Pennsylvania) is completed.
 Hassan Basha Mosque in Oran is built.
 St Mary's Church, Banbury in England, designed by S. P. Cockerell, is completed.
 Palace of Shaki Khans in Shaki, Azerbaijan is built.

Births
 May 3 – George Webster, English architect (died 1864)
 October 8 – Ludwig Förster, German-born Austrian religious architect (died 1863)

Deaths
 February 19 – Francesco Sabatini, Italian-born architect (born 1721)
 October 4 – Anthony Keck, English architect (born 1726)

References

Architecture
Years in architecture
18th-century architecture